Club Deportiu Tortosa is a Spanish football team based in Tortosa, in the autonomous community of Catalonia. Founded in 1921 it plays in Primera Catalana, holding home matches at Estadio Municipal de Tortosa, with a 6,000-seat capacity.

Season to season

44 seasons in Tercera División

Notable players
 Àngel Rangel

External links
Official website 

Football clubs in Catalonia
Association football clubs established in 1921
Divisiones Regionales de Fútbol clubs
1921 establishments in Spain